Mektoub, My Love: Canto Uno is a 2017 French romantic drama film directed by Abdellatif Kechiche. The film is an adaptation of François Bégaudeau's novel La Blessure, la vraie. It was screened in the main competition section of the 74th Venice International Film Festival. A sequel, entitled Intermezzo, was released in 2019.

Plot
In 1994, Amin a former medical student looking to become a screenwriter, returns from Paris to his hometown of Sète. While there he falls for Ophélie, a young woman who is engaged to another man, but who is having an affair with Amin's cousin Tony.

Cast

 Shaïn Boumédine as Amin
 Ophélie Bau as Ophélie
 Salim Kechiouche as Tony
 Lou Luttiau as Céline
 Alexia Chardard as Charlotte
 Hafsia Herzi as Camélia
 Kamel Saadi as Kamel

Production
In 2017 Kechiche announced he was auctioning off the Palme d'or he had received for his previous film Blue Is the Warmest Colour in order to finish the film. Producers for Mektoub had withdrawn funds during post-production after discovering that Kechiche intended to split Mektoub into two or three films. Kechiche did find the funds necessary to finish the film and succeeded in splitting the film with the sequel, Mektoub, My Love: Intermezzo premiering in 2019.

Critical response
On review aggregator Rotten Tomatoes, the film holds an approval rating of 55%, based on 20 reviews, with an average rating of 5.2/10. On Metacritic, which uses a weighted average, the film has a score of 59 out of 100, based on 9 critics, indicating "mixed or average reviews".

References

External links
 

2017 films
2017 romantic drama films
French romantic drama films
2010s French-language films
Films directed by Abdel Kechiche
Pathé films
2010s French films